Deborah Mollison (born 29 May 1958) is a British composer and songwriter, who works in both the United Kingdom and the United States.

Mollison studied composition, piano and flute at the Royal Academy of Music where she won the Else Cross Prize for pianoforte.  She then moved to UCLA and to Middlesex University where she received her PhD in music.

Deborah Mollison is best known for her scores for films and television programmes, but she has a greater diversity of style: songs, jazz, rock and orchestral works.  She has composed for commissions from the London Philharmonic Orchestra and the Britten Sinfonia.

Her philosophy
Mollison sees the role of a composer in society as a commentator. She says that her ability to empathise with her subjects brings great emotional depth to her work. For example, "Global Nation" celebrates a multi-cultural world set into England's "green and pleasant land"; "Ocean Witness" highlights the suffering of whales and dolphins at the hands of Man.  She feels that her creativity allows her to combine her skills of orchestration with those of the MIDI studio programmer/musician. 
She regularly conducts her own work and has conducted the London Philharmonic Orchestra, the BBC Concert Orchestra and the Irish Film Orchestra.

Works
Her works include:

 Earth Story (1998) TV documentary mini-series 
 Simon Magus (1999)
 Secrets of the Ancients (1999) TV documentary mini-series
 East Is East (1999)
 The Thing About Vince (2000) TV mini-series
 What the Romans Did for Us (2000) TV documentary series
 The Boys of Sunset Ridge (2001)
 Landscape Mysteries (2003)
 Souli (2004)
 Too Much Too Young (2005)
 Violin concerto: "Ocean Witness"
 Horn concerto: "Global Nation"
 May's Words (tone poem inspired by Maya Angelou)
 For Real (2009)
 Uncle Max (2011)
 Tied to a Chair (2011)
 Horace K48 0.5 (2013)
 Echo Road (2014)
 Luna Park (2015)
 Sipped (2016)
 Heather's Painting (2017)

Awards
She has won the following awards:

 UK Song '92,  
 Gold Medal – Best Short Film at the New York Film Festival "Stand Up the Real Glynn Vernon"

References

External links
Deborah Mollison

1958 births
20th-century classical composers
21st-century classical composers
Alumni of Middlesex University
Alumni of the Royal Academy of Music
English classical composers
English television composers
Living people
Women classical composers
Women film score composers
20th-century English composers
20th-century English women musicians
21st-century English women musicians
20th-century women composers
21st-century women composers